Robin Theresa Campbell-Bennett (born January 25, 1959 in Washington, D.C.) was a U.S. Olympian at 800 meters in 1980 and 1984. She competed in every Olympic Trials between 1972 and 1984.

At the 1980 Liberty Bell Classic, she won the silver medal at 800 meters, running 2:02.53, finishing between Yvonne Mondesire of Canada 2:02.34 and Ann Mackie-Morelli of Canada 2:02.63.

Her best 800 meter time of 1:59.00 came while winning the USA Outdoor Track and Field Championships.  At the 1983 World Championships in Athletics in Helsinki, Finland later that year, she finished fifth.

At the Olympic Trials in 1972, at age 13, she won the Exhibition Races for girls U-14 at both 200 meters and 1500 meters. Her times were fast enough to make the U.S. Olympic team, but she was too young to qualify.

Campbell won USA Indoor Track and Field Championships at 400 meters in 1975 and 1500 meters in 1974. She finished second at eight consecutive U.S. Indoor Championships at 800 meters.

On April 25–27, 1975, at the Mt. SAC Relays in California, she won both the 400 meters in 53.5 and the 800 meters in 2:11.6.

She was born in Washington D.C. and now resides there, where she heads Fifth Man Track Athletic Club. She attended Santa Fe College in Gainesville, Florida; University of Florida, Gainesville; and San Jose State College in San Jose, California, where she graduated with a Bachelor of Arts in liberal studies and a minor in women's studies. She served on the Drug Testing Committee, Cultural Exchange Committee, and Youth Sports Committee of USA Track & Field. She is active in the Olympic Alumni Association, Women's Sports Foundation, Stop the Silence: Stop Childhood Sexual Abuse, Fifth Man Track Club, and Potomac Valley Track Club.

Notes

1959 births
Track and field athletes from Washington, D.C.
Track and field athletes from San Jose, California
University of Florida alumni
Living people
American female middle-distance runners
San Jose State University alumni
World Athletics Championships athletes for the United States
Olympic track and field athletes of the United States
Athletes (track and field) at the 1984 Summer Olympics
Universiade medalists in athletics (track and field)
Universiade silver medalists for the United States
Medalists at the 1981 Summer Universiade
Medalists at the 1983 Summer Universiade
21st-century American women